Jasiński (feminine Jasińska, plural Jasińscy) is a Polish surname. Notable people with the surname include:

 Andrzej Jasiński (born 1936), Polish pianist
 Daniel Jasinski (born 1989), German discus thrower
 Edyta Jasińska (born 1986), Polish cyclist
 Gabriela Jasińska (born 1992), Polish volleyball player
 Jakub Jasiński (1761–1794), Polish military officer and poet
 Janusz Jasiński (born 1928), Polish historian
 Julian Jasinski (born 1996), German basketball player
 Kazimierz Jasiński (1946–2012), Polish cyclist
 Krzysztof Jasinski (born 1943), Polish theater and film actor and director
 Małgorzata Jasińska (born 1984), Polish cyclist
 Marceli Jasiński (died 1867), Polish composer
 Mirosław Jasiński (born 1960), Polish film director, screenwriter, official, diplomat
 Radosław Jasiński (born 1971), Polish footballer
 Roman Jasinski (1907–1991), principal dancer at Ballet Russe de Monte Carlo, founder of The Tulsa Ballet.
 Stanisław Jasiński and Emilia Słodkowska-Jasiński, Righteous among the Nations.
 Tadeusz Jasiński (born 1951), Polish historian
 Tomasz Jasiński (disambiguation)
 Urszula Jasińska (born 1983), Polish athlete
 Wojciech Jasiński (born 1948), Polish politician

Polish-language surnames